The Edgerton Depot is a historic railway station located at 20 South Main Street in Edgerton, Wisconsin. The station was built in 1906 to 1907 to serve the Chicago, Milwaukee, St. Paul and Pacific Railroad, also known as the Milwaukee Road; it replaced the city's original depot, which opened in 1853 with the railroad. Railroad engineer C.F. Loweth designed the station, which features a hipped roof, bracketed overhanging eaves, a red brick exterior with stone trim, and decorative brick quoins and keystones. The station was critical to the city's tobacco industry, which attracted customers from as far away as Europe; the railroad both shipped tobacco to larger cities and brought business agents to the city's firms. Passenger trains to the station, which were used both by residents and the aforementioned businessmen, primarily served routes to Milwaukee and Chicago. The station was remodeled in 1939, though rail travel in Edgerton had already begun to decline by this point; it fell even more significantly in the 1950s and 1960s, and the station closed in 1971.

The station was added to the National Register of Historic Places on April 13, 1998.

References

Railway stations on the National Register of Historic Places in Wisconsin
Railway stations in the United States opened in 1907
Former Chicago, Milwaukee, St. Paul and Pacific Railroad stations
Former railway stations in Wisconsin
National Register of Historic Places in Rock County, Wisconsin
Railway stations closed in 1971
1907 establishments in Wisconsin